The Rascals are a music production duo consisting of Khristopher Riddick-Tynes and Leon Thomas III. The Rascals have produced songs for artists such as Ariana Grande, Chris Brown, Drake, Ty Dolla Sign, Post Malone, Jessie Reyez and Zendaya.

The Rascals discography

References 

Record production duos
American songwriting teams
Hip hop duos
American hip hop record producers
Songwriters from California
Record producers from California